Hotch Potchi is a Japanese boy band group. The band was formed in 2005. Many of the original members quit, including lead singer Yousuke. They were replaced by new members.

Profile
Koshiyama Ryouta  (越山　凌太) born January 24, 1992, from Ibaraki
Izawa Yuuki (井澤　勇貴) born November 26, 1992, from Tokyo
Morishita Masaya (森下 雅也)
Shimura Yuuki (志村 勇樹)
Ohsawa Aruka (大澤　歩佳)
Isamu Takashi (勇貴)

Former members
Kurokawa Yousuke (黒川 洋介) born January 3, 1990, from Tokyo
Fukuyama Seiji (福山　聖二) born September 17, 1990, from Tokyo
Kawasaki Takeru (川崎 健) born October 31, 1988, from Shizuoka
Kamiya Hayabusa (神谷隼也人)
Himukai Shunpei (火向俊平)

Dogs
Hatch (ハッチくん)
Pottchi (ポッチくん)-(Potsuchi)

Singles

Television

External links
Official site
Official Blog site Former

Japanese boy bands
Japanese pop music groups
Musical groups from Tokyo